Bruno the Kid is a syndicated cartoon series created by Bruce Willis and produced by Film Roman In association with Flying Heart Films, Taurus Film GmbH and Co. and Nickelodeon UK. The series consists of 36 half-hour episodes, and ran from September 23, 1996, to May 26, 1997. Spanish-dubbed episodes of the series aired on Univision in the United States from September 16, 2000, to September 8, 2001, as part of the ¡De Cabeza! Saturday Morning Block. It also has Spanish-dubbed episodes of the series aired on Telefutura from 2003 as part of Toonturama on Saturday and Sunday Morning Block along with The Twisted Tales of Felix the Cat and Mortal Kombat: Defenders of the Realm.

Plot
This cartoon series stars Bruce Willis as the voice of Bruno, an 11-year-old boy who becomes a top spy for a secret espionage organization. The organization, named GLOBE, contacts Bruno via his computer and a special gadget watch, and is completely unaware of its top spy's young age, as he hides behind a computer-simulated avatar of a full-grown man (in the image of Bruce Willis).

The members of GLOBE that Bruno works with in person, such as Jarlsburg (voiced by Tony Jay), and Harris (voiced by Mark Hamill), are also unaware that GLOBE does not know Bruno's actual age, and assume that the organization must know what it is doing in sending the boy into dangerous situations.

The episodes consist of Bruno managing to live a double life without the knowledge of his parents or friends (for example, in one episode he tells his parents that he is camping in the garden and he sets up a torch to project a fake silhouette of himself onto the side of the tent, so that it looks like he is inside it). Meanwhile, with an alibi set up, Bruno will be out saving the world, or foiling a major heist with the aid of his British spy partner Jarlsburg (in one episode, one of Bruno's classmates catches Bruno on camera in the process of carrying out a spy mission and tries to blackmail him; however, Bruno erases the videotape and his secret is safe; his classmate was unable to expose him). Later in the series, Jarlsburg quits being Bruno's partner, after hesitating to fire a weapon in fear that he will hit Bruno. Bruno objects to Jarley quitting the team. Jarley eventually comes to his senses and returns to being Bruno's partner. He apologizes to Bruno for quitting. In the course of each mission, they usually meet Harris (a spoof of the character "Q" in the James Bond books and films) who supplies Bruno with gadgets, which Bruno usually finds a use for later on in the episode. As well as voicing the title character, Willis was one of the executive producers and also co-wrote and sang the theme song for the show with backing singers.

Cast and characters

Heroes
 Bruce Willis as Bruno the Kid
 Tony Jay as Jarlesburg
 Mark Hamill as Harris

Villains
 Tim Curry as Lazlo Gigahurtz
 Kenneth Mars as Professor Von Trapp
 Bronson Pinchot as General Armando Castrato
 René Auberjonois as Leonard DaLinguini
 Matt Frewer as Booby Vicious
 Dawnn Lewis as Di Archer
 Edward Asner as the Engineer
 Ed McMahon as the Engineer's henchman
 Frank Welker as Koos Koos

Other Characters
 Jennifer Hale as Leecy Davidson
 John Bower as Howard (Bruno's father)
 Kath Soucie as Grace (Bruno's mother)

Additional voices
Included in the list of additional voices were Frank Welker, Earl Boen, Ed Gilbert and Kenneth Mars.

Episodes

Video and DVD release
Episodes were released on VHS by Family Home Entertainment, but as of December 2, 2009, there have been no plans for a U.S. DVD release. The series is available on Tubi and IMDb TV. However, the episodes are released out of order.

In Italy in 2008, nine single DVD volumes were released with four episodes per volume with English soundtrack & English credits, which are now out of print.

References

External links
 
 Episode index at the Big Cartoon DataBase

Fictional secret agents and spies
Espionage television series
First-run syndicated television programs in the United States
1990s American animated television series
1996 American television series debuts
1997 American television series endings
Television series by CBS Studios
American children's animated action television series
Television series by Film Roman
Animated television series about children